Ian Patterson is an English footballer.

Ian (or Iain) Patterson (or Paterson) may also refer to:

 Ian Hunter (singer) (born 1939), of Mott the Hoople
 Ian Patterson (poet) (born 1948), British poet, translator and academic
 Ian Paterson, breast surgeon jailed for unnecessary operations in England
 Iain Paterson (born 1973), Scottish opera singer